Do is a village in the municipalities of Berkovići, Republika Srpska, and Stolac, Bosnia and Herzegovina.

Demographics 
According to the 2013 census, its population was 36: 34 Serbs in the Berkovići part with a Serb and an undeclared one living in the Stolac part.

References

Populated places in Berkovići
Populated places in Stolac
Villages in the Federation of Bosnia and Herzegovina